Jang Dong-gun (born March 7, 1972) is a South Korean actor. He is best known for his leading roles in the films Friend (2001) and Taegukgi: The Brotherhood of War (2004).

Jang is one of the highest-paid actors and celebrity endorsers in Korea, consistently topping surveys by industry insiders of most bankable stars.

Early life
Jang Dong-gun spent his childhood in Yongsan District, Seoul, and later went on to study at the Korea National University of Arts School of Drama, though he dropped out before obtaining a degree.

Career

1992–2003: Beginnings and breakout

Jang first entered the entertainment world in a talent contest in 1992. He began by acting in TV dramas such as Iljimae, The Last Match, co-starring Shim Eun-ha,
and he eventually made his film debut in Repechage (1997) together with Kim Hee-sun. 

By the late 1990s he had become quite popular in Korea, but he also became one of the first Korean stars to garner a fan following in other parts of Asia, after several of his TV dramas were screened there in the late nineties. In 1999, after acting in the critically acclaimed Nowhere to Hide as Park Joong-hoon's younger partner, Jang moved on to star in a feature that was filmed on location in Shanghai. Titled Anarchists, this tale of five young terrorists from 1930s China helped to elevate his status even further.

Jang's breakout came in early 2001 in Friend, which smashed the box office record set by Shiri to become (at the time) the biggest Korean film of all time. After playing the nice guy in almost all his previous roles, this portrayal of a tough-talking gangster from Busan led him to local stardom.
The following year he starred in the popular action blockbuster 2009 Lost Memories set in a futuristic Great Japan, and appeared in the low-budget film The Coast Guard by controversial director Kim Ki-duk.

2004–2011: Overseas popularity and Hollywood debut
In 2004, Jang took the lead role in Kang Je-gyu's Taegukgi, an epic film about two brothers set during the Korean War. The film broke Friend'''s record with an astounding 11 million tickets sold. By this time, Jang's name had become known widely throughout Asia. 

Jang followed this up with The Promise, a $30 million pan-Asian production by Chinese director Chen Kaige in which he played opposite Hong Kong star Cecilia Cheung. Meanwhile, he was cast in Typhoon as a modern-day pirate who has been betrayed by both North and South Korea. Directed by Friend's Kwak Kyung-taek, Typhoon set a new record in 2005 for the highest production budget in Korean film history at $15 million.

For the next four years, Jang kept a low profile in the Korean entertainment sphere as he worked on his Hollywood debut The Warrior's Way, also starring Kate Bosworth and Geoffrey Rush. The film encountered problems with post-production and distribution, and was only released in 2010.Lee, Hyo-won (23 November 2010). "Jang Dong-gun brings Asian vibe to Hollywood". The Korea Times.

He returned to the silver screen in 2009 as the nation's youngest (and most eligible) head of state in Jang Jin's comedy Good Morning, President.

He reunited with director Kang Je-gyu in My Way, a film set during World War II based on the true story of a Korean soldier who is drafted by the Japanese army and eventually is present at the Battle of Normandy.Kim, Jessica (1 July 2011). "Jang Dong-gun starrer My Way cranks up". 10Asia. A large-scale, ambitious pan-Asian collaboration co-starring Japanese actor Joe Odagiri and Chinese actress Fan Bingbing, My Way was the most expensive Korean movie to date (with an estimated budget of ), But despite being simultaneously released in Korea and Japan in December 2011, the film flopped at the box office.

2012–present: Return to television
Jang made his highly anticipated return to television dramas in A Gentleman's Dignity, saying he was drawn to the romantic comedy tale of 40-something-year-old men struggling to grow up and mend and forge lasting relationships."Jang Dong-gun Excited About New Drama". The Chosun Ilbo. 25 May 2012. After the series ended, Jang and co-star Kim Min-jong visited refugees in the Republic of the Congo on a mission trip sponsored by UNICEF, UNHCR and World Food Programme. It was televised on SBS documentary program Hope TV.

His 2012 film Dangerous Liaisons was a Chinese adaptation of the French literature classic set in 1930s Shanghai, directed by Hur Jin-ho and co-starring Zhang Ziyi and Cecilia Cheung.Lee, Hyo-won (23 September 2011). "Jang Dong-gun to co-star with Zhang Ziyi, Cecilia Cheung". The Korea Times.Son, Jin-ah (5 September 2012). "Dangerous Relationship Jang Dong-gun to return as a playboy" . StarN News.

Jang next starred in No Tears for the Dead, an action thriller directed by Lee Jeong-beom. He played a Korean-born American hitman who feels conflicted about killing his last target (played by Kim Min-hee).

In 2015, Jang was cast in the film Seven Years of Night, a revenge thriller based on the novel of the same name by Jung Yoo-jung. He plays a character who takes revenge on his daughter's murderer, by killing his son. The film premiered in 2018.

In 2016, Jang was cast in his first Chinese drama, Once Loved You Distressed Forever alongside actress Tang Yixin. He was then cast in the espionage noir thriller VIP, which premiered in 2017. 

Jang returned to the small screen after five years, starring in the Korean remake of the popular American legal drama  series Suits (2018). The same year, Jung starred in Kim Sung-hoon's period zombie action film Rampant alongside close friend Hyun Bin.

In 2019, Jang starred in the fantasy historical drama Arthdal Chronicles.

Personal life
Jang is a practicing Buddhist, having first explored Buddhist  reading while hospitalized in high school, after undergoing chest surgery.

He enjoys playing baseball and is a member of the celebrity amateur baseball team "Playboys" with  Lee Jong-hyuk, Hyun Bin, Kim Seung-woo, Hwang Jung-min, Ji Jin-hee, and other actors.

 Relationship and marriage 
The famously private actor surprised the country in November 2009 when he went public with his two-year romance with Ko So-young.Park, Sun-young (12 November 2009). . Korea JoongAng Daily. Since co-starring together in the 1999 film Love Wind Love Song'', rumors about Jang and Ko had spread several times in the past, but both had consistently denied them. The announcement immediately sparked speculation of an impending marriage although it wasn't until March 2010 that Jang officially told his fans at a fan meeting that he would be marrying Ko in May. After months of media frenzy leading up to their nuptials, the two tied the knot on May 2, 2010 in an extravagant wedding ceremony at Seoul's Shilla Hotel which was attended by their A-list celebrity friends, reporters and fans from around the world.

Their son, Jang Min-joon, was born on October 4, 2010. Their second child, a daughter, was born on February 25, 2014.

Filmography

Film

Television series

Television shows

Discography

Awards and nominations

Listicles

References

External links

 

1972 births
Living people
South Korean male film actors
South Korean male television actors
South Korean Buddhists
South Korean musicians
Male actors from Seoul
21st-century South Korean male actors